Jessica Joy Lutz (born 24 May 1989) is a Swiss-American retired ice hockey forward who competed internationally with the Swiss national team. She represented Switzerland in women's ice hockey at the 2014 Winter Olympics and won the bronze medal after defeating  in the bronze medal playoff. 

Lutz’s hometown is Rockville, Maryland, and she is a dual citizen of the United States and Switzerland. Her father was born in Switzerland.

She played college hockey with the UConn Huskies.

She scored the go ahead goal in the bronze medal game against Sweden.

References

1989 births
Living people
Swiss women's ice hockey forwards
American women's ice hockey forwards
American people of Swiss descent
Ice hockey people from Maryland
Ice hockey players at the 2014 Winter Olympics
Medalists at the 2014 Winter Olympics
Olympic bronze medalists for Switzerland
Olympic ice hockey players of Switzerland
Olympic medalists in ice hockey
Sportspeople from Rockville, Maryland
Swiss people of American descent
UConn Huskies women's ice hockey players